KFUM's Boldklub Roskilde is an association football club based in the town of Roskilde, Denmark, that competes in the Denmark Series, the fifth tier of the Danish football league system. Founded in 1929, it is affiliated to DBU Zealand. The team plays its home matches at Lillevang Idrætscenter where it has been based since 1979. The club reached promotion to the third tier in the 2019–20 season for the first time in club history after a 1–0 win over Ledøje-Smørum.

History

Early decades 
KFUM's Boldklub Roskilde was founded on 14 May 1929, with its first chairman becoming A. Møller. The club grew quickly, and had four teams by 1931. In 1942, the first team won DBU Zealand's B-række, the second highest regional level. However, due to World War II, less football was played during the coming years.

In 1957, Roskilde KFUM became champions of the A-række, the highest regional tier, reaching promotion to the national leagues for the first time in club history.

In 1976, construction of a new home ground began. The stadium, Lillevang Idrætscenter, was completed by 1979 and was initiated in the year of the club's 50th anniversary.

Recent history and 2020 promotion 
In recent decades, Roskilde KFUM has become established in the Denmark Series, the fourth highest tier in the Danish football league system. In 2007, the club became an affiliated team of Brøndby IF from the Danish Superliga. Brøndby chairman, Per Bjerregaard subsequently stated, that Roskilde KFUM had proven that they "had a skilled academy, which had supplied players to some of the best clubs in the Superliga". Furthermore, he said that "Roskilde KFUM is a club from which we can benefit both in the short and long term by working more closely together." In 2013, KFUM beat Brøndby 2–1 in a pre-season friendly at home in front of more than 1,000 spectators. The most famous product of the Roskilde KFUM academy is Danish international Frederik Sørensen, who has played for Juventus and 1. FC Köln. Due to his success abroad, the club has several times received solidarity payments as part of the UEFA Financial Fair Play Regulations. 

In December 2019, a DKK 9 million plan for installing pitches with artificial turf was initiated by Roskilde Municipality, giving KFUM's home ground an extra pitch from 2020 and onwards. 

KFUM Roskilde reached promotion to the Danish 2nd Division, the third tier of the Danish football league system, for the first time in club history during the 2019–20 season after the Danish FA had implemented an expansion of the division from 2021. The promotion was secured on 20 June 2020 after a 1–0 win over Ledøje-Smørum after a first-half goal by Rasmus Tangvig.

Honours and accolades

Domestic

National leagues
 Fourth Highest Danish League4
 Group 1 Winners (1): 2019–20

Regional leagues
 Sjællandsserien5
 Winners (2): 2003, 2012–13
 SBU Serie 16
 Winners (2): 1974, 2011

Cups
 DBU Pokalen
 Third round (1): 2015–16
 SBUs Seriepokal
 Runners-up (1): 1967

 4: Level 4: Kvalifikationsturneringen (1946–1965), Danmarksserien for herrer (1966–present)
 5: Level 5 (Level 1 under DBU Zealand): Sjællandsmesterskabet (1902–1927), SBUs Mesterrække (1927–1945), Sjællandsserien (1945–present)
 6: Level 6 (Level 2 under DBU Zealand): DBU Sjælland Serie 1

References

External links
 Official site

 
Football clubs in Denmark
KFUM
Association football clubs established in 1929
1929 establishments in Denmark
Sports clubs founded by the YMCA